The 1944 U.S. National Championships (now known as the US Open) was a tennis tournament that took place on the outdoor grass courts at the West Side Tennis Club, Forest Hills in New York City, United States. The tournament ran from 30 August until 4 September. It was the 64th staging of the U.S. National Championships and due to World War II it was the only Grand Slam tennis event of the year.

Finals

Men's singles

 Frank Parker defeated  William Talbert  6–4, 3–6, 6–3, 6–3

Women's singles

 Pauline Betz defeated  Margaret Osborne  6–3, 8–6

Men's doubles
 Don McNeill /  Bob Falkenburg defeated  Bill Talbert /  Pancho Segura 7–5, 6–4, 3–6, 6–1

Women's doubles
 Louise Brough /  Margaret Osborne defeated  Pauline Betz /  Doris Hart 4–6, 6–4, 6–3

Mixed doubles
 Margaret Osborne /   Bill Talbert defeated  Dorothy Bundy /  Don McNeill 6–2, 6–3

References

External links
Official US Open website

 
U.S. National Championships (tennis) by year
U.S. National Championships
U.S. National Championships
U.S. National Championships
U.S. National Championships